George W. Chalmers (June 7, 1888 in Aberdeen, Scotland – August 5, 1960 in The Bronx, New York) was a professional baseball player who was a pitcher in the Major Leagues from 1910 to 1916. He played for the Philadelphia Phillies. On October 12, 1915, he became the first European born pitcher to start a World Series game.

In April 2018, the Aberdeen Baseball Club began work on their new home field which they named in Chalmers' honour - George W. Chalmers Field.

References

1888 births
1960 deaths
Major League Baseball pitchers
Philadelphia Phillies players
Manhattan Jaspers baseball players
Major League Baseball players from the United Kingdom
Major League Baseball players from Scotland
Scottish baseball players
Sportspeople from Aberdeen
Scranton Miners players
Scottish emigrants to the United States